Annemarie Moser-Pröll (born 27 March 1953) is a former World Cup alpine ski racer from Austria.  Born in Kleinarl, Salzburg, she was the most successful female alpine ski racer during the 1970s, with an all-time women's record of six overall titles, including five consecutively. She had most success in downhill, giant slalom and combined races. In 1980, her last year as a competitor, she secured her third Olympic medal (and first gold) at Lake Placid and won five World Cup races. Her younger sister Cornelia Pröll is also a former alpine Olympian.

Career
During her career, Moser-Pröll won the overall World Cup title a record six times, including five consecutive (1971–75). She has 62 individual World Cup victories, third behind Lindsey Vonn and Mikaela Shiffrin on the female side. In winning percentage (races won of those entered) her percentage of 35.4% is second only to Mikaela Shiffrin who has won 37.5% of her races. She won five World Championship titles (3 downhill, 2 combined) and one Olympic gold medal. Of all female skiers, she is the one who won most races of a single discipline in a row (11 downhill races: all eight of the 1972–73 World Cup season, plus the first three of the following season).
 
The way to her first and only Olympic gold medal was quite long: At the 1972 games in Sapporo, Japan, she was considered the clear favourite for downhill and giant slalom, but in both events she finished second behind Marie-Theres Nadig of Switzerland. After winning a fifth consecutive title in overall and downhill, she interrupted her racing career to care for her ailing father, afflicted with lung cancer. She missed the entire 1975–76 World Cup season, including the 1976 Winter Olympics in Innsbruck, in her home country of Austria. After the death of her father in June 1976, she resumed competitive skiing and was immediately among the best, with second place in the overall World Cup standings for two seasons (1977, 1977–78), and won the overall title for the sixth time in 1979. At the 1980 Winter Olympics in Lake Placid, USA, she finished her extraordinary career by winning the downhill gold medal – with her 1972-rival Marie-Theres Nadig again on the podium, as bronze medalist.

After racing
Several weeks after the 1980 Olympics, she retired from competitive skiing and ran her own café, the "Weltcup-Café Annemarie" in Kleinarl, which was decorated with her extensive cup and trophy collection.

She married Herbert Moser in 1974 and their daughter Marion was born in 1982.  In December 2003 her first grandchild was born.

Eight months after the death of her husband, she retired from the gastronomy business in 2008 and sold the establishment to local entrepreneurs, who keep running it as "Café-Restaurant Olympia."

World Cup results

Season standings

Season titles
Moser-Pröll won sixteen titles (six overall, seven downhill and three giant slalom).

Race victories
Moser-Pröll's race wins total 62, comprising 36 downhill, 16 giant slalom, 3 slalom and 7 combined.

References

External links
 
 
  
 

Alpine skiers at the 1972 Winter Olympics
Alpine skiers at the 1980 Winter Olympics
Olympic gold medalists for Austria
Olympic silver medalists for Austria
1953 births
Living people
Olympic medalists in alpine skiing
FIS Alpine Ski World Cup champions
Medalists at the 1980 Winter Olympics
Medalists at the 1972 Winter Olympics
Olympic alpine skiers of Austria
Austrian female alpine skiers
Sportspeople from Salzburg (state)